Sandy Bay is a northern village in Saskatchewan, Canada. It is located 190 km northwest of Creighton via the Hanson Lake Road and Highway 135. The community is on the banks of the Churchill River.  It is at the end of Highway 135, after passing through Pelican Narrows.  Sandy Bay is 72 km north of Pelican Narrows. Pelican Narrows, the neighbouring community, is the administrative centre for the Peter Ballantyne Cree Nation and the majority of the townsite is reserve land.  Sandy Bay is split into two parts: the southern village part and the northern part, which is situated on the Wapaskokimaw reserve (Wapaskokimaw Reserve #202).

Sandy Bay is situated at "road's end" in the northeast area Saskatchewan and occupies land that was home to Aboriginal peoples for hundreds of years before it became the site of power generation.

It is close to the Manitoba border, and its economic and social ties to that province are extensive.

Sandy Bay is administered by the Northern Village of Sandy Bay. The community has a health clinic, a rehabilitation centre, a recreation board and a K-12 school. SaskTel put a communications tower in Sandy Bay in 2008 and the community has cellular service including, as of 2011, a 3G network. Sandy Bay has a population of about 1,200, of whom about one quarter are members of the Peter Ballantyne Cree Nation.

History 
Sandy Bay grew around the hydroelectric power station built in the late 1920s to supply power for the smelters and mines in Flin Flon, Manitoba. It was initially situated further downstream on the Churchill River, but the residents were encouraged to relocate near the proposed site of the Island Falls Generating Station to provide a source of labour for its construction. The community then grew as the Island Falls Generating Station altered traditional lifestyles. In 1965 Sandy Bay became a Local Community Authority. In 1966 the Island Falls Generating Station switched to an automatic system and the majority of jobs were lost. An all-weather road was built into the community in 1967 and other services followed. In the 1980s Sandy Bay was designated as a northern village.

The dam is presently operated by SaskPower and is now totally automated. Tourism is now the major industry in the area. There is a local store in the community, but other supplies and groceries can be purchased in Flin Flon, Manitoba, two hours away on gravel and paved highways.

Demographics 

Climate 

Sandy Bay has warm summers and cold winters.  The average daytime high does not exceed 25 °C, but it is common to have heat waves where the temperature will reach 30 °C to 35 °C.  In the winter the average daytime low does not dip below - 25 °C, but is it common to get cold fronts that bring the air temperature to -40 °C.

The majority of the precipitation occurs during the summer months, mainly June and July.  The average annual precipitation is 460mm.  During the summer months it is common for the rain to fall in large amounts during short periods of time.  Lightning and Thunder Storms are almost a daily occurrence in the summer evenings.  With heavy amounts of rain, the lakes, rivers and streams fill up fast and can cause problems.

In the summer of 2011 the Sandy Bay and Pelican Narrows region received a large amount of rain over a three-day period.  The rivers overflowed and the main road was washed out in several places.  The roads were impassable.  The communities were cut off from regular services and no one could leave.  The Hansen Lake Road, Highway 106, was washed out and became impassable.  The provincial Ministry of Transportation worked around the clock to fix the roads and had them open within a few days.

The hottest day on record was on July 21, 1929 when the daytime high reached 40 °C.  The coldest day on record was on January 15, 1930 when the daytime low reached -46.1 °C.  The most rain, in a single day, was on August 22, 1936 when 77mm of rain fell.  The day with the most snow was on November 28, 1973 when 28 cm of snow fell.

Hector Thiboutot School 
The Hector Thiboutot Community School offers schooling for children from Kindergarten to Grade 12.  The school has over 500 students. Like most schools in the division, it has a large gymnasium, science lab, home economics room, industrial arts shop, community library, computer room and many large classrooms. Furnished rental teacher housing is provided for the staff. The school offers exciting and challenging programs for the students.

Sandy Bay Memorial Beach 
The Sandy Bay Memorial Beach is a community based project in memory of the children who have drowned in the Churchill River.  In the summer of 2011 the community came together and decided to build a safe recreational area where the children can swim.  The beach provides a controlled swimming environment and some of the safety features are floating docks, buoys, and an emergency access ramp which are not common in Aboriginal Northern communities.  The community is planning on having lifeguards working in the summer months and it will be the perfect spot for the whole family to swim.  This project has created new jobs for the community and gives youth work experience.  The Hector Thiboutot School joined the project to teach the students about water safety and about playing near frozen rivers/lakes in the winter.

See also 
 List of communities in Saskatchewan
 List of villages in Saskatchewan

References 

Division No. 18, Saskatchewan
Hudson's Bay Company trading posts
Northern villages in Saskatchewan
Peter Ballantyne Cree Nation